= Tickle Point Formation =

Newfoundland formation

- Stratigraphic range: 685–679 Ma
- Type: Formation

Lithology
- Primary: Felsic non-marine volcanics

Location
- Region: Newfoundland
- Country: Canada
- Occurrence of the Tickle Point Formation in southeastern Newfoundland

The Tickle Point Formation is a formation cropping out in Newfoundland.
